Cantata Peak is a  mountain summit located in the Chugach Mountains, in Anchorage Municipality in the U.S. state of Alaska. The first ascent of the peak was made August 26, 1967, by Dave Johnston and Karen Courtright. The mountain's cantata name was officially adopted in 1968 by the United States Geological Survey, based on a recommendation by Karen in keeping with the music theme of the immediate area. Within three miles of the peak there is a Symphony Lake, Concerto Peak, Flute Peak, Triangle Peak, Organ Mountain, Calliope Mountain, and Hurdygurdy Mountain.

Climate

Based on the Köppen climate classification, Cantata Peak is located in a subarctic climate with cold, snowy winters, and mild summers. Temperatures can drop below −20 °C with wind chill factors below −30 °C. May and June are the best months for climbing in terms of catching favorable weather. Precipitation runoff from the peak drains into tributaries of Eagle River.

See also

List of mountain peaks of Alaska
Geography of Alaska

References

External links
 Summit view: YouTube
 Weather forecast: Cantata Peak
 Climbing information: Cantata Peak at Winterbear.com 

Mountains of Alaska
Mountains of Anchorage, Alaska
North American 1000 m summits